Rangitaiki is a rural community in the Taupō District and Bay of Plenty Region of New Zealand's North Island, located near the source of Rangitaiki River.  runs through it.

It is an area of "frost flats" at the southern end of the Kaingaroa Plains, in the North Island Volcanic Plateau. European explorer and botanist John Bidwill visited the plain in 1839 and author Katherine Mansfield described the unique landscape in The Woman at the Store.

The area experiences temperature similar to Central Otago in the winter months. It experiences scrub fires in the summer.

The settlement includes a school and country tavern.

Demographics

Rangataiki statistical area had a population of 132 at the 2018 New Zealand census, a decrease of 3 people (−2.2%) since the 2013 census, and a decrease of 30 people (−18.5%) since the 2006 census. There were 60 households, comprising 72 males and 60 females, giving a sex ratio of 1.2 males per female. The median age was 30.8 years (compared with 37.4 years nationally), with 27 people (20.5%) aged under 15 years, 39 (29.5%) aged 15 to 29, 66 (50.0%) aged 30 to 64, and 6 (4.5%) aged 65 or older.

Ethnicities were 86.4% European/Pākehā, 18.2% Māori, 2.3% Pacific peoples, 9.1% Asian, and 2.3% other ethnicities. People may identify with more than one ethnicity.

The percentage of people born overseas was 11.4, compared with 27.1% nationally.

Although some people chose not to answer the census's question about religious affiliation, 68.2% had no religion, 25.0% were Christian and 2.3% had other religions.

Of those at least 15 years old, 15 (14.3%) people had a bachelor's or higher degree, and 15 (14.3%) people had no formal qualifications. The median income was $44,700, compared with $31,800 nationally. 15 people (14.3%) earned over $70,000 compared to 17.2% nationally. The employment status of those at least 15 was that 63 (60.0%) people were employed full-time, and 24 (22.9%) were part-time.

Education

References

Taupō District
Populated places in the Bay of Plenty Region